The Hague Convention on Protection of Children and Co-operation in Respect of Intercountry Adoption (or Hague Adoption Convention) is an international convention dealing with international adoption, child laundering, and child trafficking in an effort to protect those involved from the corruption, abuses, and exploitation which sometimes accompanies international adoption. The convention has been considered crucial because it provides a formal international and intergovernmental recognition of intercountry adoption to ensure that adoptions under the convention will generally be recognized and given effect in other party countries.

Objectives
The preamble to the Convention states:
Intercountry adoptions shall be made in the best interests of the child and with respect for his or her fundamental rights and to prevent the abduction [sic. should be "abduction of"], the sale of, or traffic in children and each State should take, as a matter of priority, appropriate measures to enable the child to remain in the care of his or her family of origin.

The main objectives of the convention, are set out in Article 1:
to establish safeguards to ensure that intercountry adoptions take place in the best interests of the child and with respect for his or her fundamental rights as recognized in international law,
to establish a system of co-operation amongst Contracting States to ensure that those safeguards are respected and thereby prevent the abduction, the sale of, or traffic in children,
to secure the recognition in Contracting States of adoptions made in accordance with the convention.

History
The convention was developed by the Hague Conference on Private International Law, the preeminent organization in the area of private international law. It was concluded on 29 May 1993 and entered into force on 1 May 1995. As of March 2019, the convention has been ratified by 99 states. South Korea, Nepal, and Russia have signed but not ratified it. Many countries which have not ratified the Convention do not permit foreign adoptions of their children nor adoptions of foreign children.

Policies and procedures
With respect to the previous multilateral instruments which include some provisions regarding intercountry adoption, the Hague Adoption Convention is the major multilateral instrument regulating international adoption and calls for the need for co-ordination and direct co-operation between countries to ensure that appropriate safeguards are respected.

The Hague Adoption Convention has several requirements. The adoption process includes establishing a "Central Authority" to serve as the country's primary contact in adoption processes; satisfying several checks for a child eligible for adoption, including verifying the propriety of the adoption under the laws of both countries; making a reasonable prior effort to facilitate a domestic adoption; and agreeing to use only certified adoption agencies.

Article III outlines the responsibilities that the entire process must be authorized by central adoption authorities designated by the contracting states. If fully implemented at the national level, the convention offers a protective framework against the potential risks of private adoption (when the adoptive parents set the terms of the adoption directly with the biological parents or with children's institutions placed in the country of origin, without recurring to accredited adoption service providers).

The Implementation and Operation of the 1993 Intercountry Adoption Convention: Guide to Good Practice, prepared by HCCH, provides assistance to the operation, use and interpretation of the convention.

Compliance
To comply with international standards, many changes have been introduced in national legislation enacting laws to criminalize the act of obtaining improper gains from international adoptions. However, instances of trafficking in and sale of children for the purpose of adoption continue to take place in many parts of the world. In the fiscal year of 2006, the Department of State Office of Children's Issues assisted in the return to the United States of 260 children who had been abducted to or wrongfully retained from other countries and 171 children were returned from countries that are Convention partners with the United States. Especially during emergency situations, natural disasters or conflicts, children are observed to be adopted without strict legal procedures being followed, with a risk that there may be cases of child trafficking. An excessive bureaucratization of the adoption process after the implementation of the Hague Adoption Convention has been noted to establishing possible additional barriers to the placement of children.

References

International adoption
Treaties concluded in 1993
Treaties entered into force in 1995
Adoption law
Hague Conference on Private International Law conventions
Treaties of Albania
Treaties of Australia
Treaties of Austria
Treaties of Belarus
Treaties of Belgium
Treaties of Benin
Treaties of Brazil
Treaties of Bulgaria
Treaties of Canada
Treaties of Chile
Treaties of the People's Republic of China
Treaties of Costa Rica
Treaties of Croatia
Treaties of Cyprus
Treaties of the Czech Republic
Treaties of Denmark
Treaties of Ecuador
Treaties of Estonia
Treaties of Finland
Treaties of France
Treaties of Georgia (country)
Treaties of Germany
Treaties of Ghana
Treaties of Guyana
Treaties of Haiti
Treaties of Honduras
Treaties of Hungary
Treaties of Iceland
Treaties of India
Treaties of Ireland
Treaties of Israel
Treaties of Italy
Treaties of Kyrgyzstan
Treaties of Latvia
Treaties of Lithuania
Treaties of Luxembourg
Treaties of Malta
Treaties of Mauritius
Treaties of Mexico
Treaties of Monaco
Treaties of Montenegro
Treaties of New Zealand
Treaties of the Netherlands
Treaties of Norway
Treaties of Panama
Treaties of Paraguay
Treaties of Peru
Treaties of the Philippines
Treaties of Poland
Treaties of Portugal
Treaties of Romania
Treaties of Serbia
Treaties of Slovakia
Treaties of Slovenia
Treaties of South Africa
Treaties of Spain
Treaties of Sri Lanka
Treaties of Sweden
Treaties of Switzerland
Treaties of North Macedonia
Treaties of Turkey
Treaties of the United Kingdom
Treaties of the United States
Treaties of Uruguay
Treaties of Venezuela
Treaties of Vietnam
Treaties of Andorra
Treaties of Armenia
Treaties of Azerbaijan
Treaties of Belize
Treaties of Bolivia
Treaties of Burkina Faso
Treaties of Burundi
Treaties of Cambodia
Treaties of Cape Verde
Treaties of Colombia
Treaties of Cuba
Treaties of the Dominican Republic
Treaties of El Salvador
Treaties of Fiji
Treaties of Guatemala
Treaties of Guinea
Treaties of Ivory Coast
Treaties of Kazakhstan
Treaties of Kenya
Treaties of Lesotho
Treaties of Liechtenstein
Treaties of Madagascar
Treaties of Mali
Treaties of Mongolia
Treaties of Moldova
Treaties of Namibia
Treaties of Rwanda
Treaties of San Marino
Treaties of Senegal
Treaties of Seychelles
Treaties of Eswatini
Treaties of Thailand
Treaties of Togo
Treaties of Zambia
Family law treaties
1993 in the Netherlands
Treaties extended to Greenland
Treaties extended to the Faroe Islands
Treaties extended to the Caribbean Netherlands
Treaties extended to the Isle of Man
Treaties extended to Ashmore and Cartier Islands
Treaties extended to the Australian Antarctic Territory
Treaties extended to Christmas Island
Treaties extended to the Cocos (Keeling) Islands
Treaties extended to the Coral Sea Islands
Treaties extended to Heard Island and McDonald Islands
Treaties extended to Norfolk Island
Treaties extended to Hong Kong
Treaties extended to Macau
20th century in The Hague